Nindub is a locally known Sumerian god. He is identified with the city-state of Lagash.

References 
Michael Jordan, Encyclopedia of Gods, Kyle Cathie Limited, 2002
Manières de penser dans l’Antiquité méditerranéenne et orientale: Mélanges offerts à Francis Schmidt par ses élèves, ses collègues et ses amis, p.47
Mesopotamian gods